Pittosporum muricatum is a species of plant in the Pittosporaceae family. It is endemic to New Caledonia.

Location and history
This plant is commonly known as melatumnin.

References

Endemic flora of New Caledonia
muricatum
Endangered plants
Taxonomy articles created by Polbot